Beonyeong-ro() is road name in South Korea.
 Beonyeong-ro (Busan)
 Beonyeong-ro (Gunsan~Jeonju)
 Beonyeong-ro (Ansan~Siheung)
 Beonyeong-ro (Gunpo)
 Beonyeong-ro (Paju)
 Beonyeong-ro (Sokcho)
 Beonyeong-ro (Taebaek)
 Beonyeong-ro (Hongcheon)
 Beonyeong-ro (Nonsan)
 Beonyeong-ro (Boryeong)
 Beonyeong-ro (Asan)
 Beonyeong-ro (Cheonan)
 Beonyeong-ro (Gyeryong)
 Beonyeong-ro (Buan)
 Beonyeong-ro (Mokpo)
 Beonyeong-ro (Yeongju)
 Beonyeong-ro (Yangsan)
 Beonyeong-ro (Jeju)